The 1888 Albion football team, sometimes known as the Albion Methodists, was an American football team that represented Albion College in the Michigan Intercollegiate Athletic Association (MIAA) during the 1888 college football season. The team compiled a 0–2 record, and was outscored by a combined total of 84 to 4.  Albion scheduled two of its games in 1888 against opponents that later became NCAA Division I FBS football programs, which today are among the top five in winning percentage and total wins at that level.

Schedule

References

Albion
Albion Britons football seasons
Albion football